is a Japanese football player who plays for Renofa Yamaguchi FC. His father Isao Yamase participated in the 1984 Winter Olympics as a biathlete. His brother Yukihiro Yamase is also footballer.

Club career
Yamase was born in Sapporo on 22 September 1981. After graduating from high school, he joined J2 League club Consadole Sapporo based in his local in 2000. He played many matches as offensive midfielder from first season under manager Takeshi Okada. Consadole also won the champions in 2000 season and was promoted to J1 League. In 2000, he played as regular player and was selected Rookie of the Year award. Although he was given number 10 shirt, he could not play at all in the match for injured from summer 2002. Consadole also finished at the bottom place in 2002 season and was relegated to J2.

In 2003, Yamase moved to J1 club Urawa Reds. Reds won the champions 2003 J.League Cup. In 2004, Reds won the 2nd place in J1 League and J.League Cup.

In 2005, Yamase moved to Yokohama F. Marinos which club won the J1 champions  for 2 years in a row until 2004. He was given number 10 shirt and played many matches as offensive midfielder. He spent in this club the longest season in his career.

In 2011, Yamase moved to Kawasaki Frontale. He played all 34 matches in 2011 season. However his opportunity to play decreased in 2012 season.

In 2013, Yamase moved to J2 club Kyoto Sanga FC. He played many matches as regular player until 2016. In 2017, he moved to Avispa Fukuoka and played in 2 seasons. In 2019, he moved to Ehime FC.

National team career
In June 2001, Yamase was selected Japan U-20 national team for 2001 World Youth Championship. At this tournament, he played all 3 matches and scored 2 goals.

Japan's coach Ivica Osim handed him his first senior cap on 9 August 2006, in a friendly match against Trinidad and Tobago. His first goal for Japan came on 22 August 2007 in a friendly match against Cameroon. He played 13 games and scored 5 goals for Japan until 2013.

Club statistics

National team statistics

Honors and awards

Individual honors
 J.League Rookie of the Year: 2001
 East Asian Football Championship Top Scorer: 2008

Team honors
 J1 League 2nd Stage Winner: 2004
 J.League Cup Winner: 2003

References

External links

Japan National Football Team Database

Profile at Yokohama F. Marinos 
Profile at Avispa Fukuoka

1981 births
Living people
Association football people from Hokkaido
Japanese footballers
Japan youth international footballers
Japan international footballers
J1 League players
J2 League players
Hokkaido Consadole Sapporo players
Urawa Red Diamonds players
Yokohama F. Marinos players
Kawasaki Frontale players
Kyoto Sanga FC players
Avispa Fukuoka players
Ehime FC players
Renofa Yamaguchi FC players
Association football midfielders
Sportspeople from Sapporo